The 2021–22 Women's Big Bash League season or WBBL|07 was the seventh season of the Women's Big Bash League (WBBL), the semi-professional women's Twenty20 domestic cricket competition in Australia. The tournament was played from 14 October to 27 November 2021. The Sydney Thunder entered the season as the defending champions, having won their second title in WBBL06, but failed to qualify for the knockout stage.

In the championship decider, played at Perth Stadium, the Perth Scorchers defeated the Adelaide Strikers by 12 runs. Marizanne Kapp was named Player of the Final for her influential all-round performance, scoring 31* off 23 deliveries and producing bowling figures of 1/25 from four overs to help the Scorchers claim their maiden WBBL title.

Indian marquee Harmanpreet Kaur was named Player of the Tournament in her first season with the Melbourne Renegades, marking the first time the award was not won by a player from Australia or New Zealand.

Teams

Each squad was made up of 15 active players. Teams could sign up to five 'marquee players', with a maximum of three of those from overseas. Marquees were defined as any overseas player, or a local player who holds a Cricket Australia national contract at the start of the WBBL|07 signing period.

Due to state border restrictions brought about by the COVID-19 pandemic, Cricket Australia announced there would be no WBBL|07 matches played in New South Wales and Victoria. Consequently, half of the league's teams (the Melbourne Renegades, Melbourne Stars, Sydney Sixers and Sydney Thunder) were unable to host home games for the season. Due to renovation works on their regular primary ground at Allan Border Field, the Brisbane Heat played home games in Mackay for the season.

The table below lists each team's marquee players and other key details for the season.

Personnel changes

Local players 
The table below lists local player movements made ahead of the season.

Overseas players 
On 26 September 2021, the Sydney Thunder announced the signings of overseas marquees Smriti Mandhana and Deepti Sharma, meaning WBBL|07 would feature Indian players in the league for the first time since the 2018–19 season.

The table below lists changes to overseas player allocations made ahead of the season.

Leadership 
Coaching changes made ahead of the season included:

 Simon Helmot was appointed head coach of the Melbourne Renegades, replacing Lachlan Stevens.
 Jarrad Loughman was appointed head coach of the Melbourne Stars, replacing Trent Woodhill.
 On 2 July 2021, the Sydney Sixers announced two-time championship coach Ben Sawyer would not return for WBBL|07, having instead taken on a full-time assistant role for the Australian national women's team. However, on 27 July, it was revealed Cricket Australia agreed to allow Sawyer to coach the Sixers for a seventh and final season.

Captaincy changes made ahead of the season included:

 Sophie Molineux was appointed captain of the Melbourne Renegades, replacing Amy Satterthwaite (17–23 win–loss record).
Rachel Priest was appointed captain of the Hobart Hurricanes, replacing Corinne Hall (7–27 win–loss record).
After Sydney Thunder captain Rachael Haynes announced she would be unlikely to participate in the season due to family reasons, Hannah Darlington was appointed to stand in as Haynes' replacement.
Tahlia McGrath was appointed captain of the Adelaide Strikers, replacing Suzie Bates (24–21 win–loss record).

Media coverage 
Coverage of the league received a boost from the previous season with subscription channel Fox Cricket broadcasting an additional 23 matches, marking the first time every match would be televised. Seven Network would again broadcast 24 matches on free-to-air television, while the remaining 35 matches were free to stream live on cricket.com.au and the Cricket Australia Live app. All 59 matches were also available to watch live and on-demand via Kayo Sports.

Points table

Win–loss table 
Below is a summary of results for each team's fourteen regular season matches, plus finals where applicable, in chronological order. A team's opponent for any given match is listed above the margin of victory/defeat.

Fixtures 
As per all previous seasons, WBBL|07 featured a 56-match double round-robin, followed by a finals series featuring the top four qualifiers. The original fixture was released on 8 July 2021, with Cricket Australia (CA) noting the schedule was subject to any changes that may be required in response to the COVID-19 pandemic.

On 16 September, CA announced the opening fortnight of the competition would be shifted to Tasmania. 20 games featuring all eight teams were scheduled to be played at three venues, beginning with Blundstone Arena in Hobart before moving to University of Tasmania Stadium and its neighbouring Invermay Park in Launceston. On 7 October, CA revealed the revised schedule for the remaining 36 regular season games, which consisted of blocks of matches in Perth, Launceston, Adelaide and Mackay.

On 8 November, CA confirmed the last week of the regular season (November 17–21) would be the inaugural WBBL First Nations Round, intending to mark the league's commitment to deepening education and meaningful connection with Indigenous People of Australia. During the round, teams wore Indigenous kits designed by Aboriginal and Torres Strait Islanders artists, and observed Welcome to Country and smoking ceremonies.

Week 1

Week 2

Week 3

Week 4

Week 5

Week 6

Knockout phase
On 7 September 2021, Cricket Australia announced the WBBL would use a new playoffs format for the 2021–22 season.

The WBBL|07 knockout phase would again feature the four highest-ranked teams at the conclusion of the regular season, though it would begin with an 'Eliminator' between the third and fourth seeds. The winner of the Eliminator would then play the second seed in the 'Challenger'. Both the Eliminator and Challenger matches would be played at the home ground of the second seed. The first seed would automatically qualify for the championship decider, simply known as the 'Final', with home ground advantage against the winner of the Challenger.

Alistair Dobson, Cricket Australia's General Manager of Big Bash Leagues, said "the League views the Final as a marquee moment in the summer" and the highest-ranked qualifier will not only "have a guaranteed path to the Final, they'll also have the backing of a strong home crowd, with fans given more time to secure their ticket to the Final".

Perth Stadium was selected as the venue for the Final after the Perth Scorchers finished the regular season on top of the points table. The second-placed Melbourne Renegades selected Adelaide Oval as the venue for the Eliminator and Challenger due to border restrictions preventing matches from being played in their home state of Victoria.

Eliminator

Challenger

Final

Background 

Ending the regular season on top of the points table, the Perth Scorchers qualified for their third championship decider. They previously finished as runners-up in WBBL02 and WBBL03, losing to the Sydney Sixers on both occasions. Coach Shelley Nitschke, considered a legend of South Australian cricket, and captain Sophie Devine each played for the Adelaide Strikers in the league's inaugural and subsequent seasons before joining the Scorchers in WBBL|06.

After emphatic victories in the Eliminator and Challenger, the Adelaide Strikers qualified for their second championship decider. They previously finished as runners-up in WBBL05, losing the final which was defined by a Player of the Match innings from then Brisbane Heat (and now Perth Scorchers) batter Beth Mooney. Members of the Strikers' squad to have won a WBBL title include Sarah Coyte, who was named Player of the Final when the Sixers defeated the Scorchers in 2017–18.

All-rounders Marizanne Kapp and Dane van Niekerk were also contributors to the Sixers' past championships but each player moved to new teams, the Scorchers and Strikers respectively, ahead of WBBL|07. They would be the first married couple to compete against one another in a WBBL final—a match-up which garnered media attention with van Niekerk, in an interview days beforehand, noting her own trepidation about facing Kapp's bowling.

While the smaller WACA Ground and Lilac Hill Park serve as their typical home venues, the Scorchers selected Perth Stadium to host the Final, where only two WBBL matches had previously been played. Although the Strikers held an overall 8–6 head-to-head edge coming into the Final, the Scorchers won both encounters earlier in the season—one via Super Over, and the other by 12 runs.

Match summary 

Batting first, the Scorchers made a cautious start, scoring 18 from the opening four overs. With runs beginning to flow—Sophie Devine cutting the leading wicket-taker of the season, Amanda-Jade Wellington, for back-to-back boundaries in the seventh over—Strikers captain Tahlia McGrath brought herself on to bowl with immediate effect, claiming the prized wicket of Beth Mooney for 19. Then, having just reached the halfway point of the innings with her team at 1/65, Devine was run out from a direct hit by Dane van Niekerk. The following over, Chloe Piparo was removed for 19, edging a Darcie Brown outswinger which was caught by wicket-keeper Teagan McPharlin.

Heather Graham and Marizanne Kapp met at the crease in the 12th over, and they put on a partnership of 40 runs from the next 32 balls, ending when Graham was caught at cover for 23. Kapp, in her unbeaten innings of 31 from 23, proceeded to strike two boundaries in the 18th over against Sarah Coyte. Alana King managed similar in the 20th to take the Scorchers to a total of 5/146.

Beginning the run chase in "disarray", the Strikers scored just 12 runs in the first four overs, which included a maiden bowled by Kapp to van Niekerk who played-and-missed multiple times. The Strikers finished the powerplay at 2/16—their worst start to an innings for the tournament. Tahlia McGrath and Laura Wolvaardt combined for 61 off the next 45 balls, but the partnership ended in the 14th over when McGrath was caught at point off the bowling of Taneale Peschel.  

In the 17th over Bridget Patterson, after hitting a six and a four, was dismissed by Kapp on the fourth ball, though Madeline Penna scored another boundary on the sixth ball to take 17 runs from the over. Now needing 36 off the last 18 deliveries, the Strikers "remained a late chance". However, Alana King and Heather Graham only conceded seven runs each in their subsequent overs, greatly reducing the chances of a Strikers victory. With her team requiring 22 from the final over, Penna could only muster one boundary while Peschel repeatedly beat the bat at the death to seal a 12-run win for the Scorchers.

Post-match 

The Perth Scorchers became the fourth team to hold the WBBL trophy aloft, following the Sydney Thunder, Sydney Sixers and Brisbane Heat. Writing for News.com.au, Tyson Otto said the Scorchers "never really looked like losing" despite "several dramatic moments", and that they were the "clear standout team of the tournament". Owen Leonard of The Sydney Morning Herald commended the "admirable resistance" of the Strikers' McGrath and Wolvaardt, but claimed the Scorchers' "flawless bowling power play" was "too deep to compensate for".

Having overcome illness during the week leading up to the final, Marizanne Kapp was named Player of the Match for her performance with bat and ball. Kapp and Mooney both claimed their third WBBL championships, a feat previously only achieved by Sammy-Jo Johnson and Lauren Smith.

The crowd of 15,511 spectators was the fourth-highest attendance for any WBBL match (the top three attendances were for matches played as double-headers with the BBL), and also the highest for a WBBL final. The most-watched game in the league's history, the Final rated a combined average audience of 535,000 across TV and streaming platforms, eclipsing the 506,000 audience for the WBBL04 decider.

Statistics

Highest totals

Most runs 
The Golden Bat award was introduced to the league in WBBL|07. Having already been added as a feature of the BBL in 2019–20, the award recognises the leading run-scorer of the tournament, with the top-ranked player at any given time wearing a distinctive gold-coloured cap rather than their official franchise headwear.

Most wickets 
The Golden Arm award was introduced to the league in WBBL|07. Having already been added as a feature of the BBL in 2019–20, the award recognises the leading wicket-taker of the tournament, with the top-ranked player at any given time wearing a distinctive gold-coloured cap rather than their official franchise headwear.

Awards

Player of the tournament 
Player of the Tournament votes are awarded on a 3-2-1 basis by the two standing umpires at the conclusion of every match, meaning a player can receive a maximum of six votes per game.

Source:

Team of the tournament 
The selection panel for the Team of the Tournament was made up of former players Lisa Sthalekar (Seven Network) and Mel Jones (Fox Cricket), cricket.com.au journalist Laura Jolly and national selector Shawn Flegler. The team is intended to mimic regular WBBL conditions such as a maximum of three overseas players, a realistic mix of batters and bowlers, as well as a captain, wicket-keeper and coach.

  Beth Mooney (Perth Scorchers) 
  Sophie Devine (Perth Scorchers) – captain
  Georgia Redmayne (Brisbane Heat) – wicket-keeper
  Harmanpreet Kaur (Melbourne Renegades)
  Grace Harris (Brisbane Heat)
  Tahlia McGrath (Adelaide Strikers)
  Amanda-Jade Wellington (Adelaide Strikers)
  Jess Jonassen (Brisbane Heat)
  Hannah Darlington (Sydney Thunder)
  Darcie Brown (Adelaide Strikers)
  Tayla Vlaeminck (Hobart Hurricanes)
  Simon Helmot (Melbourne Renegades) – coach

Source:

Young gun award
Players under 21 years of age at the start of the season were eligible for the Young Gun Award. The winner was chosen by national selector Shawn Flegler.

Sydney Thunder batter Phoebe Litchfield was named the Young Gun for WBBL|07, having scored 263 runs during the season at an average of 21.91 and a strike rate of 109.12.

Most valuable players 
Each team designated an award to adjudge and recognise their most outstanding contributor for the season.

 Adelaide Strikers: Katie Mack
 Brisbane Heat: Grace Harris
 Hobart Hurricanes: Tayla Vlaeminck
 Melbourne Renegades: Harmanpreet Kaur
 Melbourne Stars: Kim Garth
 Perth Scorchers: Sophie Devine
 Sydney Sixers: Nicole Bolton
 Sydney Thunder: Smriti Mandhana

"Player of the match" tally
The table below shows the number of Player of the Match awards won by each player throughout the season. The career tally indicates the number of awards won by a player throughout her entire time in the league at the conclusion of the season, including awards won while previously playing for a different WBBL team.

See also
 2021–22 Big Bash League season

Notes

References

External links
 Official fixtures
 Series home at ESPN Cricinfo

 
2021–22 Women's Big Bash League season by team
Women's Big Bash League seasons
!
Women's Big Bash League